Tjaša Rutar (born 10 December 1984) is a road cyclist from Slovenia. She participated at the 2011 UCI Road World Championships and 2012 UCI Road World Championships.

References

External links
 profile at Procyclingstats.com

1984 births
Slovenian female cyclists
Living people
Place of birth missing (living people)